Floored by Four was an American rock band from New York City. The group consisted of bassist and singer Mike Watt, guitarist Nels Cline, keyboardist Yuka Honda and drummer Dougie Bowne. They were inspired by Sun Ra, Miles Davis, Captain Beefheart and Sonic Youth among others. Their eponymous debut album was released in September 2010 on Chimera Records.

Discography
 Floored by Four (2010)

References

Rock music groups from New York (state)
Musical groups established in 2010
Musical groups from New York City
2010 establishments in New York City